Haise may refer to:

People 
Franck Haise (born 1971), French football player and manager
Fred Haise (born 1933), American astronaut

Vehicles 
Jinbei Haise, Chinese automobile produced by Jinbei
Jinbei Haise X30L, Chinese automobile produced by Jinbei
Jinbei Grand Haise, Chinese automobile produced by Jinbei